The Datta Khel incident was a skirmish that took place between a U.S. helicopter and Pakistani forces took place in the Datta Khel area on May 17, 2011. According to NATO, a hasty American occupational encampment along the Afghanistan-Pakistan border took direct and indirect fire from Pakistan. Two U.S. helicopters flew into the area. According to the Pakistani military, the helicopters had breached its airspace. Pakistani forces fired at a helicopter twice, and the helicopter returned fire, injuring two soldiers. Pakistan reportedly deployed two attack helicopters, which arrived after the U.S. helicopters had left.

References

Pakistan–United States military relations